Grammatophyllum wallisii (Wallis's grammatophyllum) is a member of the family Orchidaceae endemic to the Philippines. The name honors Gustav Wallis.

References

wallisii
Orchids of the Philippines
Plants described in 1876